Dariusz Grzesik (born 10 January 1966) is a retired Polish football midfielder.

References

1966 births
Living people
Polish footballers
Piast Gliwice players
GKS Katowice players
Ruch Chorzów players
Rozwój Katowice players
Association football midfielders
Poland international footballers